The International Association of Nitrox and Technical Divers (IANTD) is a scuba diving organization concerned with certification and training in recreational diving, technical diving, cave diving, wreck diving, rebreather diving and diver leadership. Originally formed as the International Association of Nitrox Divers in 1985 by Dick Rutkowski it pioneered the introduction of Enriched Air Nitrox diving to the recreational diving community, before its name change in 1992 to reflect the more "technical" diving courses it had begun to teach. The European Association of Technical Divers (EATD) became part of IANTD in 1993.

History 
Dick Rutkowski, the former dive supervisor for the National Oceanic and Atmospheric Administration (NOAA), formed the International Association of Nitrox Divers (IAND) in 1985 to teach nitrox to recreational divers. This program was developed through NOAA during his tenure. In 1992 Tom Mount became the President and CEO, and the name of the organization was changed to the International Association of Nitrox and Technical Divers (IANTD). Billy Deans has also served as a director of IANTD. Prior to founding IAND, Rutkowski worked for Dr Wells and was director of the diver training at NOAA. 

As the first agency to offer recreational certification in nitrox, IANTD grew at a steady pace from 1985 through February 1992 with the support of Hyperbarics International. The European Association of Technical Divers (EATD) was formed by Kevin Gurr, Richard Bull, and Rob Palmer in the UK in 1992 and merged into IANTD the following year. In 1992 Tom Mount became President of IANTD, a position that he held until 2005. During this period of time IANTD saw rapid growth as the diving community began to accept the use of technology such as nitrox. In 1992 the National Association of Underwater Instructors (NAUI) became the first mainstream US agency to accept IANTD qualifications, and the Sub-Aqua Association (SAA) became the first UK agency to recognise IANTD certifications in 1993.

In 2000, IANTD introduced a free-diver program  prepared by Divetech Ltd  of Grand Cayman.

On January 7, 2016 IANTD becomes the first agency in the scuba industry to acknowledge digitally validated logs as an official proof of diving experience, furthermore it declares Diviac its official digital logbook.

In March 2018, IANTD joined the  United States RSTC and renewed its ISO certification  .

Qualifications
The IANTD qualification system was structured as follows as of January 2013.      
Recreational programs
 Supervised Diver
 Open Water Diver
 Essentials Diver
 Advanced Open Water Diver
 Open Water Side Mount Diver
 Rescue Diver
 EANx Diver
 Deep Diver
 Advanced EANx Diver
 Speciality Diver
 Elite Diver
 Public Safety
 Open Water DPV Diver
 Decompression Specialist
 Self-sufficient Diver
 Diver First Aid

 Oxygen Administration
 Diving Medical Technician
 AED
 Hyperbaric Chamber Operator
 CPR
 EANx Blender
 Trimix Gas Blender
 LSS Service Technician
 Underwater Theatrical Performer
 Recreational Trimix Diver

Technical programs
 Technical diver
 Expedition Trimix Diver
 In Water Recompression
 Normoxic Trimix Diver
 Trimix Diver

Cave Programs
 Cavern Diver
 Introductory Cave Diver
 Cave Diver
 Limited Mine Diver
 Mine Diver
 Technical Cave Diver
 Rebreather Cave Diver
 Advanced Cave - Stage
 Advanced cave - side mount
 Advanced Cave - DPV
 Advanced cave - survey

Wreck program
 Wreck diver
 Rebreather Wreck Diver
 Advanced Wreck Diver
 Technical Wreck Diver

Rebreather programs
 Rebreather experience
 Recreational CCR Diver
 SCR Rebreather Diver
 CCR Diver
 pSCR Diver

Leadership programs
 Dive Master
 Cavern Dive Master
 Advanced EANx Supervisor
 Advanced Recreational Trimix Supervisor

References

External links 

The IANTD website

Underwater diving training organizations
1985 establishments in Florida